This List of World War II military service football teams includes all those top-level American football teams consisting of active duty military personnel of the United States Armed Forces that played against collegiate or professional opponents during the seasons of 1942, 1943, 1944, or 1945.

Background
During the years of World War II the American military saw a rapid expansion of its system of military bases as the number of young men skyrocketed through enlistment and conscription. Many of these included former collegiate and professional stars of the football gridiron. Some 19 active or former players of the National Football League would ultimately die in the American war effort, in addition to an uncounted number of former collegians.

Early in the war effort one football writer said about the applicability of the formation of football teams with military training:

Football is a body-toughener. Football lights the fighting spark in fighting men. It develops aggressiveness, teamwork, stamina, physical and mental coordination under active stress, and therefore it holds a foremost place in our national wartime training program. Teams by the hundreds are in formation at various Army camps and posts and Navy bases. The greatest participation in the history of the sport will be entered in the records of 1942.

Beginning in the fall of 1942, the War Department began to promote organized football exhibitions involving select teams from its military bases that played full schedules against the depleted squads of regional universities. These elite teams are included in the following list.

These were further distilled into military All-Star Teams which played against collegiate and professional opponents. In 1942, the U.S. Army named two "All-Army teams" of approximately 60 players per unit, located in the East and West. These were informally known as the "Million Dollar teams" — their purpose being to raise upwards of $1 million for the Army Emergency Relief fund through a series of exhibition clashes with the professional teams of the National Football League. The Eastern Army All-Star team was led by Lt. Col. Robert R. Neyland, and played September 1942 games against the New York Giants, Brooklyn Dodgers, and Chicago Bears. The Western All-Stars, coached by Major Wallace Wade of Duke University, played a slate including games beginning late in August 1942 against the Washington Redskins, Chicago Cardinals, Detroit Lions, Green Bay Packers, and Giants. By the end of the exhibition games, it had raised $241,392.29 for the fund.

By the time that the war had ended, various service teams had been coached by such legends as Bernie Bierman (Iowa Pre-Flight Seahawks), Paul Brown (Great Lakes Navy Bluejackets), Don Faurot (Iowa Pre-Flight Seahawks and Jacksonville Naval Air Station Flyers), Tony Hinkle (Great Lakes Navy Bluejackets), Jack Meagher (Iowa Pre-Flight Seahawks), and Joe Verducci (Alameda Coast Guard Sea Lions)—as well as the aforementioned Neyland and Wade.

Even with the surrender of Japan on September 2, 1945, however, the times still remained uncertain to an extent with the Allied occupation forces facing possible pacification campaigns in the defeated Axis countries, not to mention increasingly strained relations with the Soviet Union. As a result, much of the American war apparatus remained intact, at least initially, during peacetime—including many service football teams.

The State Fair of Louisiana, which normally sponsored a series of college football games as part of its annual State Fair Classic, found itself without its regular host schools at times during the war when they were forced to drop their football programs. The locally based Barksdale Field Sky Raiders were invited to play in two of the classic's October games, one against the Selman Army Airfield Cyclones and another against the Lake Charles Army Airfield Flying Tigers; the Camp Swift Dragons ended up filling in for Lake Charles Army Airfield. The fair's "Negro Day" game featured Wiley College paired against the Randolph Field Brown Bombers (the African American counterpart to the Randolph Field Ramblers). Barksdale Field had also previously competed in the 1934 classic, against Texas Military College.

Even the service academies remained strong through 1945, with Army and Navy's annual game featuring the two top teams of the 1945 AP Poll and the game being declared the "Game of the Century," with Pres. Harry S. Truman himself attending. Army's Doc Blanchard even won the Heisman Trophy that year.

After encountering no significant resistance in the occupied countries over the subsequent year (save for a few, isolated efforts at sabotage by Edelweiss Pirates or Japanese holdouts), most American servicemen were then quickly discharged, and the service football teams essentially left with them. Truman issued Proclamation 2714 formally ending the war on December 31, 1946.

One noteworthy post-war game (which may have typified just how far the few remaining service teams had fallen since Iowa Pre-Flight’s magical run at #2 in the 1943 AP Poll) pitted Central State University of Ohio against the Wright Field Kittyhawks; despite it being CSU’s first season as a new four-year institution in 1947, CSU still won the game by an astonishing score of 101–0.

List of teams

United States Army teams

Teams associated with the bases of the United States Army included:

 Camp Davis (North Carolina) Fighting AAs
 Camp Grant Warriors, Camp Grant, Illinois
 Fort Douglas (Utah)
 Fort Dupont (District of Columbia)
 Fort Knox Tankers (Kentucky)
 Fort Monmouth (New Jersey)
 Fort Riley Centaurs (Kansas)
 Fort Warren Broncos (Wyoming)

United States Army Air Forces teams
Teams associated with the bases of the United States Army Air Forces included:

 Albuquerque Army Air Base Flying Kelleys, Albuquerque, New Mexico
 Camp Pickett, Blackstone, Virginia
 Greensboro Tech-Hawks
 March Field Flyers
 Randolph Field Ramblers
 The 1943 Randolph Field Ramblers football team played the Texas Longhorns to a 7–7 tie in the 1944 Cotton Bowl Classic played on January 1.
 The 1944 Randolph Field Ramblers football team finished the season 12–0 and was ranked #3 in the AP Poll.
 Second Air Force Superbombers
 The 1942 Second Air Force Bombers football team won the 1943 Sun Bowl, played on January 1, over the Hardin–Simmons Cowboys.
 Third Air Force Gremlins

United States Navy teams
Teams associated with the bases of the United States Navy included:

 Bainbridge Commodores football
 Bunker Hill Naval Air Station Blockbusters
 Camp Peary Pirates
 Corpus Christi Naval Air Station Comets
 Del Monte Pre-Flight Navyators
 Fort Pierce
 Georgia Pre-Flight Skycrackers
 Great Lakes Navy Bluejackets
 The 1942 and 1943 Great Lakes Navy Bluejackets football teams were coached by former Butler University coach Tony Hinkle. The 1944 and 1945 Great Lakes Navy teams were coached by former Ohio State coach Paul Brown.
 Iowa Pre-Flight
 The 1942 Iowa Pre-Flight Seahawks football team was coached by former Mississippi State, Tulane, and Minnesota coach Bernie Bierman. The 1943 Iowa Pre-Flight team finished the season 9–1 and was ranked #2 in the AP Poll; they were coached by former Missouri coach Don Faurot. The 1944 Iowa Pre-Flight team was coached by former Rice and Auburn coach Jack Meagher.
 Jacksonville Naval Air Station Flyers
 The 1944 Jacksonville Naval Air Station Flyers football team was coached by former Missouri coach Don Faurot.
 Lakehurst Naval Air Station (New Jersey)
 Norman Naval Air Station Zoomers
 North Carolina Pre-Flight Cloudbusters
 Ottumwa Naval Air Station Sea Flyers
 Pensacola Naval Air Station Goslings
 Saint Mary's Pre-Flight Air Devils

United States Marine Corps teams
 Camp Davis Blue Brigade, Wilmington, North Carolina
 El Toro Flying Marines

United States Coast Guard teams
Teams associated with the bases of the United States Coast Guard included:

 Alameda Coast Guard Sea Lions, Governors Island, California
The 1942, 1943, and 1944 Alameda Coast Guard Sea Lions football teams were coached by future St. Mary's and San Francisco State coach Joe Verducci.
 Manhattan Beach Coast Guard Depth Bombers

See also
 List of American football games in Europe during World War II
 1942 college football season
 1943 college football season
 1944 college football season
 1945 college football season

Footnotes

Further reading
 John Daye, Encyclopedia of Armed Forces Football: The Complete History of the Glory Days. Haworth, New Jersey: St. Johann Press, 2014.

World War II military service football teams
World War II military service football teams
Football teams